Blake White (born 15 March 2000) is an American-born-Jamaican footballer.

Club career 
On 30 June 2018, White appeared for Atlanta United 2, the USL affiliate of Atlanta United FC, as an 84-minute substitute in a 3-0 loss to Nashville SC.

Edwards has committed to playing college soccer at the University of Alabama-Birmingham from 2018 and beyond.

International career 
White has played for Jamaica at the U17 international level.

References

External links 

2000 births
Living people
Jamaican footballers
Association football midfielders
UAB Blazers men's soccer players
Atlanta United 2 players
USL Championship players
Soccer players from Georgia (U.S. state)